The men's 200 metre freestyle competition of the 2014 FINA World Swimming Championships (25 m) was held on 3 December.

Records
Prior to the competition, the existing world and championship records were as follows.

Results

Heats
The heats were held at 09:30.

Final
The final was held at 18:00.

References

Men's 200 m freestlye